In February 2019 the 2018 Sri Lankan local elections were held in Sri Lanka due to a prior delay. However, due to an injunction issued by the Supreme Court, the election was not held in Elpitiya.

Details
On 30 January 2018 the Supreme Court issued an injunction preventing election in Elpitiya DC following a petition by the Democratic United National Front against the rejection of their nomination list.

Background

2011 Local authority election results

Results

References

Sri Lanka
Local elections
2018
Elpitiya